NS-Dokumentationszentrum may refer to:
NS Documentation Centre of the City of Cologne
NS-Dokumentationszentrum (Munich)